Militsa Mircheva (born 24 May 1994) is a Bulgarian long distance runner. She placed 108th in the 2016 Olympics marathon.

References

External links

 

1994 births
Living people
Bulgarian female long-distance runners
Bulgarian female marathon runners
Place of birth missing (living people)
Athletes (track and field) at the 2016 Summer Olympics
Olympic athletes of Bulgaria
Florida State Seminoles women's track and field athletes
20th-century Bulgarian women
21st-century Bulgarian women